Sho Miyagawa (宮川 将, born October 19, 1990 in Sennan, Osaka) is a Japanese professional baseball pitcher for the Tohoku Rakuten Golden Eagles in Japan's Nippon Professional Baseball.

External links

NPB.com

1990 births
Japanese baseball players
Living people
Nippon Professional Baseball pitchers
Baseball people from Osaka Prefecture
Tohoku Rakuten Golden Eagles players
People from Sennan, Osaka